Hägerstensåsen is a district of the Hägersten-Liljeholmen borough in Söderort, the southern suburban part of Stockholm. It is located 7 km southwest of the capital and has a population of approximately 7,800 inhabitants.

See also
Hägerstensåsen metro station

References

Populated places established in 1964
Districts of Stockholm